John Charles Evans (born 24 March 1947 in Torquay) is an English former professional footballer and an international bowls player.

Football career
Evans began his footballing career as an apprentice with Torquay United, turning professional in April 1965. He made six league appearances as a winger, scoring once, before leaving Plainmoor. But his football career took second place to bowls.

Bowls career
He later became a regular member of the England bowls team, first capped in 1973, then winning a silver medal in the 1974 British Commonwealth Games pairs competition with Peter Line.

He won a bronze medal in the fours with Bill Irish, Tommy Armstrong and  Peter Line at the 1976 World Outdoor Bowls Championship in Johannesburg in addition to a silver medal in the team event (Leonard Cup). He also won a silver in the pairs at the 1974 British Commonwealth Games. He reached the quarter-finals of the World Indoor Bowls Championships singles competition in 1991.
 
In April 2001 he played in a trial to return to the England team for the first time since the 1982–83 bowling season, and later that year qualified to play in the 2002 World Indoor Championships.

Personal life
He ran a bowls tour company which ceased trading in 2008.

References

1947 births
Living people
Sportspeople from Torquay
English footballers
Association football wingers
Torquay United F.C. players
English male bowls players
Commonwealth Games silver medallists for England
Bowls players at the 1974 British Commonwealth Games
Commonwealth Games medallists in lawn bowls
Medallists at the 1974 British Commonwealth Games